The Málaga–Almería road massacre, also known as the Desbandá, was an attack on the republican-dominated city of Málaga, Spain and its citizens on 8 February 1937 during the Spanish Civil War. The city was penetrated by Nationalist forces and their fascist supporters. An estimated 5,000–15,000 civilians attempted to evacuate the besieged city via the N-340 coastal road connecting Málaga to the city of Almería.

Background 
On 12 April 1931, Spain had its first democratic elections since the dictatorship of Miguel Primo de Rivera. The elections resulted in the formation of the Spanish Second Republic. Consequently, a great divide was created among two of the more prevalent political ideologies of the time.

El golpe de estado was a coup d’etat on 18 July 1936 by the Nationalist forces against the Republican government. As a result of the failure of the coup, the Spanish Civil War began immediately afterwards.

Aside from the capital city of Sevilla, the southern region of Andalucía (Andalusia) was primarily a Republican stronghold during the war. Málaga, a "Republican" city on the southern coast of Andalucia, was soon targeted by the Nationalist forces. On 17 January 1937, Nationalist forces led by General Queipo de Llano were sent to seize Granada, Marbella, Ronda and other surrounding areas. These actions were not perceived by Republican authorities to require immediate retaliation or preparation. However, the Nationalist force greatly outnumbered the army in Málaga. The Nationalist forces consisted of Spanish soldiers, approximately 10,000 Italian Blackshirts, German supporters, and even troops from the cities of Ceuta, Melilla, the Canary Islands and the Balearic Islands. Meanwhile, only 12,000 Republican troops were prepared to defend Málaga with 8,000 guns.

Attack on Málaga 
On 3 February 1937, the Nationalist forces were met by Republican opposition in Ronda as they neared the city of Málaga. However, the defensive efforts were squashed. The city of Málaga was soon besieged by Nationalist forces. Italian Corpo Truppe Volontarie units attacked the city from the surrounding highlands on 6 February, forcing the evacuation of civilians from the city. 8 February 1937 marked the fall of Málaga to Nationalist forces. The city was attacked by land, air, and sea. Troops infiltrated Málaga with guns and tanks, while Italian and German aerial and marine forces bombed and burned the city.

Due to its geographical location along the southern coast of the Mediterranean Sea and its mountainous, inland boundaries (the Sierra Morena and the Baetic System) the city of Málaga was limited in means of transport and evacuation. As a result, thousands of citizens in Málaga were left defenceless and unprepared for the attacks at the hands of the Nationalist forces. The frantic civilians traveling unprotected along the highway were slaughtered. The Republican Air Force was unable to halt the attacks.

Consequences 
Approximately 3,000–5,000 civilians were killed en route to Almería. Mothers carrying children were slaughtered, leaving many children along the way. The elderly, the injured, and those physically, emotionally, and spiritually incapable of completing the trek were swiftly eradicated. Various accounts from the 1960s claim that corpses could still be found alongside the highway from the aerial and ground attacks.

Those who reached Almería were largely rejected by the city’s citizens out of fear of the daunting and encroaching Nationalist forces. Those who declined to evacuate Málaga (approximately 4,000 people) were systematically rounded-up, raped, killed, and piled into mass graves, such as the San Rafael Cemetery.

Memoriam 

The Málaga–Almería road massacre serves as a dark reminder of the political, economic, social, and religious unrest that plagued Spain during the 20th Century.

In 2005, a memorial service was initiated in Torre del Mar (approximately halfway between Málaga and Almería) to honor the victims of the massacre. Since then, it has become a tradition to create a memorial wreath for the victims every 7 February.

See also
List of massacres in Spain
Red Terror (Spain)
White Terror (Spain)

References

España: Ayer y Hoy: “La estructura del Estado y la vida política”.

Bibliography 
Muñoz, Pedro M., y Marcelino C. Marcos. “La estructura del Estado y la vida política”. España: Ayer y Hoy. Upper Saddle River, NJ: Pearson/Prentice Hall, 2010. 204–223.
Hernández, Javier. "El Blog De Los Kroquetas." Weblog post. El Blog De Los Kroquetas. N.p., 28 Jan. 2010. Web. 20 Oct. 2013.
Geoff, Billett. "Geoffreybillett : Photography." Geoffrey Billett Documentary Photography. N.p., 24 Sept. 2011. Web. 20 Oct. 2013.

External links 
San Jose Cemetery
Malaga 1937

1937 in Spain
Massacres in 1937
Spanish Civil War massacres
Mass murder in 1937
February 1937 events
History of the province of Málaga